The Revival Party is a political party in Moldova.

Overview
The founding congress of party was held on 29 October 2011 and elected Vadim Mişin chairman of the party, former Prime Minister of Moldova Vasile Tarlev co-chairman and Oleg Babenco deputy сhairman. The congress was attended by 212 delegates from 28 districts of Moldova.

Notable members
Vadim Mişin
Vasile Tarlev

References

External links
 Official website 
 Partidul «Renaştere» – e-democracy 

Political parties established in 2012
2012 establishments in Moldova
Russian political parties in Moldova
Anti-Romanian sentiment
Socialist parties in Moldova